Alexander Neumeister (born 17 December 1941) is a German industrial designer from Berlin. He studied at the Ulm School of Design. He gained recognition for his designs of the ICE and Transrapid for which he received the German Design Award. The brand ICE has 100% recognition in Germany.
He also designed Japanese Shinkansen trains including the 500 Series Shinkansen, the German DMU "Talent" and the "C-Wagen" of the Munich subway.

In 1970, he founded N+P Industrial Design. He left the company in 2012.

References

External links
 Homepage

1941 births
Living people
German industrial designers
Artists from Berlin